Albert E. Kemp (birth unknown – death unknown) was a rugby union and professional rugby league footballer who played in the 1890s and 1900s. He played representative level rugby union (RU) for Yorkshire, and at club level for Hull Kingston Rovers, and representative level rugby league (RL) for Yorkshire, and at club level for Hull Kingston Rovers (Heritage No.), as a forward (prior to the specialist positions of), during the era of contested scrums.

Playing career

Challenge Cup Final appearances
Albert Kemp played as a forward, i.e. number 8, in Hull Kingston Rovers' 0–6 defeat by Warrington in the 1905 Challenge Cup Final during the 1904–05 season at Headingley Rugby Stadium, Leeds on Saturday 29 April 1905, in front of a crowd of 19,638.

References

English rugby league players
English rugby union players
Hull Kingston Rovers players
Place of birth missing
Place of death missing
Rugby league forwards
Year of birth missing
Year of death missing
Yorkshire County RFU players
Yorkshire rugby league team players